North Caroline High School is located in Ridgely, Maryland, United States and is part of the Caroline County Public Schools (Maryland) system.  It is one of two high schools in Caroline County. The school serves 1,114 in grades nine to twelve. Students generally live in the northern area of Caroline County in Ridgely, Greensboro, Denton, and a number of smaller towns. Lockerman Middle School serves as the feeder school.

North Caroline High School is ranked 125th within Maryland by U.S. News, and #6,863 nationally in 2019.

Administration
Principal: Matt Spiker

Academics
Students are grouped into one of the following clusters based on their future career choices:
Health and Human Services
Business and Consumer Services
Engineering and Manufacturing
Environmental and Natural Resources
Arts/Media and Communications
Within these clusters, students choose majors that dictate their course choices.

Students have the opportunity of simultaneously attending the Caroline Career and Technology Center located adjacent to the school building.

NCHS also offers a growing number of Advanced Placement courses, including Art, Biology, Calculus AB, English Language, English Literature, French Language, Government and Politics, Psychology, Spanish Language, and U.S. History. The AP participation rate is 32%, with an exam pass rate of 61%.

According to the 2018-2019 School Report Card, 49.6% percent of students were proficient or higher on state tests in Mathematics, and 52.1% of students were proficient or higher in English Language Arts.

The school received a 4/5 star rating on the 2018-19 MD Report Card, ranking in the 47th percentile for Maryland Public Schools.

Athletics
Students at NCHS can participate in the following sports:

Cheerleading
Cross Country
Field Hockey
Football
Golf (State Champions – 1997)
Boys' Soccer
Girls' Soccer
Volleyball (State Champions – 1990)
Boys' Basketball (State Champions – 1987)
Girls' Basketball
Indoor Track
Wrestling
Baseball (State Champions – 1998, 2011)
Softball (State Champions – 1988, 1991, 2001, 2003, 2005, 2017)
Lacrosse
Tennis
Track and Field

NCHS sports teams participate in the Maryland 2A division, as based on their enrollment numbers.

In 1987, the Maryland Public Secondary Schools Athletics Association awarded NCHS the Jack Willard Memorial Award during the boys' and girls' state basketball tournaments in recognition of their superior sportsmanship during the tournament.

Clubs and organizations
Students at NCHS can participate in the following clubs and organizations:

Fellowship of Christian Athletes
Newspaper
Future Business Leaders of America
Yearbook
Palette and Brush Club
Stock Market Club
Mock Trial
Chess Club
Photography Club
Night Court
Teen Court
Drama Club
Intramural Volleyball Club
Weight Lifting Club
Band
Engineering and Robotics Club                                     
Science Club
National Honor Society
Spanish Club
Color Guard
S.H.O.P.
L.A.S.T.
Student Government Association
Service Learning Club
Excel Program
Future Educators Association

Demographics
As of 2019, the student population consists of the following ethnicities:
White: 66%
Black: 12%
Hispanic: 15%
Asian/Pacific Islander: <1%
American Indian/Alaskan Native: <1%
Bi/Multi-Racial: 6%

31% of the students are eligible for the free or reduced-price lunch program.

Four-year adjusted cohort graduation rate is 80.4%, with 81.8% graduating in five or fewer years.

The dropout rate for the 2018-19 school year was 8.37%.

References

External links
North Caroline High School
Caroline County Public Schools
 Class of 1990 Reunion Website
Wrestling Stats and Records

Public high schools in Maryland
Schools in Caroline County, Maryland